New Lynn is a residential suburb in West Auckland, New Zealand, located 10 kilometres to the southwest of the Auckland city centre. The suburb is located along the Whau River, one of the narrowest points of the North Island, and was the location of Te Tōanga Waka, a traditional waka portage between the Waitematā and Manukau harbours.

The settlement developed in the early 20th century due to the brick and pottery industry, and in 1963 became a major commercial centre for Auckland with the opening of LynnMall, the first American-style shopping centre in New Zealand. Since 2010, New Lynn has been the focus of large-scale urban development, with the introduction of medium and high density housing close to the town centre and train station.

History

Early history and establishment

The New Lynn area and the Whau River are a part of the traditional rohe of Te Kawerau ā Maki, an iwi that traces their ancestry to some of the earliest inhabitants of the Auckland Region. The traditional name for the area is Te Rewarewa, referring to a local creek. The Whau River was a borderland, marking the division of lands between Te Kawerau ā Maki and the Tāmaki Māori iwi of the Auckland isthmus: Ngāti Whātua Ōrākei and in earlier times, Waiohua. The Whau River was one of the narrowest points between the Waitematā Harbour on the east coast of the island, and the Manukau Harbour on the west. Te Tōanga Waka, one of the most important portages in the area, allowed for waka to be transported between the two harbours, along the Whau River, the Avondale Stream (Wai Tahurangi), and a short overland path, marked in modern times by a road named Portage Road. Kotuitanga (Ken Maunder Park) marks the point where waka were no longer able to be paddled, and was traditionally a site used for waka construction. The banks of the Whau River were the locations of many seasonal fishing settlements.

When European colonisation of the Auckland Region began, New Lynn was known as a barren scrubland. In 1845, the first wooden bridge was built across the Whau River. New Lynn was named by Frederick Utting, who surveyed the western Whau area in 1863. He named the area after King's Lynn in Norfolk, England, as the area reminded him of the countryside of his homeland. Land at New Lynn was first auctioned in 1865, but growth in the area was slow until the 1910s.

The first European settlers arrived in the area in the 1850s, primarily farmers and people involved with the kauri logging and gum digging industries. In 1865, New Lynn became a trade centre when the port of New Lynn opened on the Whau River. Boats could only operate in the port during narrow stretches of time at high tide, and otherwise rested in the mud of the river.

New Lynn grew significantly due to the brick and ceramics industries. The first brickyard was established by Dr Daniel Pollen on the Whau River at Rosebank in 1852. He brought in brickmakers from Staffordshire in England, four of whom later established their own yards along the river. By 1870 there were 13 brick and clay yards on the local waterways, exploiting the high-quality clay in the area. In the 1870s, the largest yards produced between 10,000 and 15,000 bricks per week. Many of the ceramics companies failed due to the 1880s depression, competition, and changing preferences to use wood rather than bricks for construction. The first brick kiln opened in New Lynn in 1861, and of the 39 brick and clayworks of West Auckland, 23 were located on the Whau River, with most concentrated around New Lynn.

In March 1880, the New Lynn railway station opened, connecting New Lynn to Auckland by rail and stimulating growth in the area. Two years later, Alfred Ramsden constructed the New Lynn Hotel on Great North Road, which closed in 1908 due to their liquor license lapsing during the temperance movement in New Zealand. The building was demolished in July 2008, due to deterioration. The first school in the area, New Lynn School, opened in 1888 at the modern site of Kelston Girls' College. The school was relocated to current site in 1914.

A new area of New Lynn was subdivided in 1902, to the south of the railway station. Known as the Hetana Hamlet, this was named after Prime Minister Richard Seddon, who was known to Māori by the name Hetana.

Suburban development

In the early 1900s, a group of citizens led by Archibald Grandison lobbied the Waitemata County for New Lynn to become an independent town district. Grandison and his supporters felt that New Lynn would grow as an outer city suburb of Auckland in the future, and had very different needs to the majority of the rural communities in the county. The population grew five times between 1900 and 1910, and in August of the following year, New Lynn became a town district. By 1 April 1919 it had grown enough to become a borough, allowing the council to take out larger loans to invest in the infrastructure of the area. Many of the street names in New Lynn are named for commissioners of the town and borough, as well as indigenous tree species. During the early 20th century, a significant Scottish immigrant population moved to New Lynn.

The Astley Tannery, which first opened in 1888, became one of the largest employers in New Lynn during World War I when demand for leather goods significantly increased. The business was greatly successful in the 1930s, closing in the 1990s. Industrial waste from the tannery and neighbouring abbatoir was discharged directly into the Whau River, becoming a major source of pollution for the waterway.

In 1925, Rice Owen Clark moved his large clay pipeworks factory from Hobsonville to New Lynn. Due to the pressures of the Great Depression, the various brick and ceramics businesses of West Auckland merged to form the Amalgamated Brick and Pipe Compan in 1929, who focused operations at New Lynn. The company were able to produce up to 30,000 red facing bricks per fortnight at their Ambrico kiln. The brickworks was known for its 46 metre-high chimney in central New Lynn.

In 1926, the Delta Theatre opened in New Lynn, becoming a focal point of the community, holding a range of events including film showings, live entertainment and dances. The theatre was demolished 1986. A new bridge crossing the Whau River was completed in December 1931, replacing the older wooden structures on Great North Road. The bridge was a point of contention between the New Lynn borough council and the Waitemata County and Auckland City, who wanted a bridge of a significantly smaller size to what the borough council proposed. By 1935, the population of New Lynn had grown to 3,500.

Crown Lynn and LynnMall

During World War II, New Lynn was considered a vulnerable area by the government, due to the brickworks and its proximity to the border of Auckland City. Because of this, concrete machine gun posts and barbed wire were installed along the railway between Portage Road and St Georges Road, tank traps were built in the area, and air raid shelters were built at the corner of Margan and Seabrooke Avenues. Due to restrictions on the importation of British goods during the war, the Amalgamated Brick and Pottery began mass-producing crockery for the New Zealand market, growing to become one of the largest brick and ceramics companies in the Southern Hemisphere, known for their Crown Lynn pottery range. The ceramics industry led to widescale immigration of Pasifika New Zealanders to the area during the 1960s and 1970s, many of whom were employed at the Crown Lynn Potteries factories.

The port of New Lynn closed for commercial operations in 1948, when a final shipment of bricks and mānuka were transported from the port on the Rahiri.

In 1965, LynnMall, the first modern American-style shopping centre in New Zealand was opened in New Lynn. It immediately became a retail hub for Auckland, and influenced the nearby Henderson borough to create a similar mall, the Henderson Square (now known as WestCity Waitakere). In September 1974, New Zealand's first Pizza Hut restaurant opened in New Lynn.

In 1978, a new bridge across the Whau River was built along Rata Street, acting as a bypass to divert traffic away from New Lynn and Great North Road. On 17 July 1981, the Jack McCorquindale Community Centre opened in New Lynn, named after a former borough mayor.

In 1989, the Amalgamated Brick and Pipe Company (then known as Ceramco) closed down operations. In the same year, New Lynn ceased being an independent borough, merging with other local governments of West Auckland in the local body reforms of 1989 to become a part of the Waitakere City.

Urban development

In 2010, the New Lynn railway station was redeveloped as a transport hub, with a new station constructed and the existing tracks moved into an underground trench. This was the start of an urban revitalisation project for New Lynn, where the New Lynn town centre was redeveloped as a commercial centre and mid to high desity residential hub. The first stage of the Merchant Quarter, immediately adjacent to the train station, was completed in 2013, and the Merchant Quarter Apartments, one of the tallest buildings in West Auckland, was opened in 2015. As of 2020, New Lynn is the major commercial centre of the Whau local board area, and one of the major commercial hubs of West Auckland.

Te Toi Uku: Crown Lynn Clayworks Museum opened in May 2015.

On 3 September 2021, seven people were injured in a stabbing attack at the Countdown supermarket in LynnMall.

Demographics

New Lynn had a population of 20,214 at the 2018 New Zealand census, an increase of 1,980 people (10.9%) since the 2013 census, and an increase of 2,946 people (17.1%) since the 2006 census. There were 6,744 households, comprising 10,074 males and 10,143 females, giving a sex ratio of 0.99 males per female, with 3,795 people (18.8%) aged under 15 years, 4,593 (22.7%) aged 15 to 29, 9,591 (47.4%) aged 30 to 64, and 2,232 (11.0%) aged 65 or older.

Ethnicities were 40.0% European/Pākehā, 10.5% Māori, 16.1% Pacific peoples, 42.7% Asian, and 3.5% other ethnicities. People may identify with more than one ethnicity.

The percentage of people born overseas was 49.1, compared with 27.1% nationally.

Although some people chose not to answer the census's question about religious affiliation, 38.2% had no religion, 34.5% were Christian, 0.6% had Māori religious beliefs, 11.3% were Hindu, 4.7% were Muslim, 2.6% were Buddhist and 3.0% had other religions.

Of those at least 15 years old, 4,800 (29.2%) people had a bachelor's or higher degree, and 2,166 (13.2%) people had no formal qualifications. 2,148 people (13.1%) earned over $70,000 compared to 17.2% nationally. The employment status of those at least 15 was that 8,586 (52.3%) people were employed full-time, 2,082 (12.7%) were part-time, and 786 (4.8%) were unemployed.

Local government

From 1876 until 1929, New Lynn was administered by the Waitemata County, a large rural county north and west of the city of Auckland. In 1929, the area split from the county, forming the New Lynn Borough Council. Between 1929 and 1989, 78 councillors (also known as commissioners) served on the borough council. In 1989, the borough was merged into the Waitakere City. Waitakere City Council was amalgamated into Auckland Council in November 2010.

Within the Auckland Council, New Lynn is a part of the Whau local government area governed by the Whau Local Board. It is a part of the Whau ward, which elects one councillor to the Auckland Council.

Mayors of New Lynn Borough

Between 1929 and 1989, eight people held the position of Mayor of New Lynn Borough. The longest standing mayor of the borough was Stanley William Rickards, who held the position for 14 years.

1929–1931 Charles Fisher Gardner
1931–1938 George Lawson
1938–1941 Anthony Theo Reiman
1941–1955 Stanley William Rickards
1955–1959 Hugh Brown
1959–1965 Samuel Richard Noall 
1965–1974 Christopher John Robert McCorquindale
1974–1977 Hugh Brown
1977–1980 Christopher John Robert McCorquindale
1980–1989 Ronald Bruce McNaughton

Transport
New Lynn Railway Station, located next to the bus transport centre and the LynnMall shopping centre, was upgraded in 2008–2010 to cater for the increased frequency of trains expected on the Auckland regional network after its electrification. The section of track on the Western line between Portage Road and Titirangi Road was trenched to allow trains to pass beneath the New Lynn town centre. A twin-platform station was built below road level near the site of the existing station. As part of the redevelopment projects for the area, part of Totara Avenue, in the New Lynn town centre, is being transformed into a shared space.

New Lynn has had ready road access to the Auckland CBD since the Northwestern Motorway and an expressway through Waterview were completed in the late 1970s.

Education
New Lynn School opened in 1888, Arahoe School opened in 1958. Fruitvale Road School opened in 1962, however has its origins in the Fruitvale School, which opened in the late 19th century at the current site of the Fruitvale Community Hall.

It is a special school for students with intellectual impairments. The school runs ten satellite classes at nearby primary, intermediate and secondary schools.

New Lynn has no secondary schools but is serviced by large school campuses in surrounding suburbs, including Kelston Boys' High School, Kelston Girls' College, Avondale College (co-ed), and Green Bay High School (co-ed).

References

Bibliography

Suburbs of Auckland
Whau Local Board Area
Populated places around the Waitematā Harbour
West Auckland, New Zealand